Zeydabad is a city in Kerman Province, Iran.

Zeydabad may refer to:

Zeydabad, Bam, Kerman Province
Zeydabad Chehel Tokhm, Bam County, Kerman Province
Zeydabad, Fahraj, Kerman Province
Zeydabad, Razavi Khorasan
Zeydabad Rural District, in Kerman Province